Milloy is a surname. Notable people with the surname include:

 Albert E. Milloy (born 1921), Major General, United States Army
 Christin Milloy, Canadian politician and LGBT activist
 John Milloy (born 1965), former politician in Ontario, Canada
 Lawyer Milloy (born 1973), former American college and professional football player
 May Milloy (1875–1967), American actress on Broadway, vaudeville, and in several films
 Steven Milloy, lawyer, lobbyist, author and Fox News commentator